Jaithari tehsil is a fourth-order administrative and revenue division, a subdivision of third-order administrative and revenue division of Anuppur district of Madhya Pradesh.

Geography
Jaithari tehsil has an area of 909.49 sq kilometers. It is bounded by Anuppur tehsil in the northwest, north and northeast, Chhattisgarh in the east, southeast and south and Pushprajgarh tehsil in the southwest and west.

See also 
Anuppur district

Citations

External links

Tehsils of Madhya Pradesh
Anuppur district